"Warm Ride" is a song written by Barry, Robin and Maurice Gibb, and recorded by the Bee Gees and during the 1977 Saturday Night Fever sessions in France. The Bee Gees original, if unfinished, recording remained unreleased until 2007 when it was mixed and included on a reissue of Bee Gees Greatest. The song was an outtake from the soundtrack.

Personnel
Barry Gibb – lead vocals, guitar
Robin Gibb – vocals 
Maurice Gibb – vocals, bass
Blue Weaver – keyboards, synthesiser, piano
Dennis Bryon – drums
Joe Lala – percussion

Cover versions
 The song was recorded by Rare Earth, for whom it was originally written by the Bee Gees. The song reached number 39 on the US charts and number 68 on the Australian charts.
 Graham Bonnet's version was released as a single and reached number 2 in Australia in August 1978.
 Andy Gibb's version of the song was recorded in 1979 and released in 1980 on his last studio album, After Dark. It was the last song recorded for the album with backing vocals done by older brother Barry Gibb.

References

1977 songs
Bee Gees songs
Andy Gibb songs
Songs written by Barry Gibb
Songs written by Robin Gibb
Songs written by Maurice Gibb
Disco songs
Song recordings produced by Albhy Galuten